Dorothy Canning Miller (February 6, 1904 – July 11, 2003) was an American art curator and one of the most influential people in American modern art for more than half of the 20th century.  The first professionally trained curator at the Museum of Modern Art (MoMA),  she was one of the very few women in her time who held a museum position of such responsibility.

Early life and education
Miller, the daughter of Arthur Barrett Miller and Edith Almena Canning, was born in Hopedale, Massachusetts and grew up in Montclair, New Jersey.  After graduating from Smith College in 1925, she trained with John Cotton Dana of the Newark Museum, which was then one of the most creative and ambitious museums in the country,  and worked there from 1926 to 1929.  From 1930 to 1932, she worked for Mrs. Henry Lang cataloging and researching a collection of  Native American art which was to be donated to the Montclair Art Museum.

Career at MoMA
The Museum of Modern Art, founded in 1929, did not yet have its own building in the early 1930s and was housed in a series of temporary quarters. Miller first came to director Alfred H. Barr, Jr.'s attention in 1933, when she and Holger Cahill (with whom Miller was living in Greenwich Village — they married in 1938) were curating the First Municipal Art Exhibition in space donated by the Rockefeller family. Some of the participating artists wanted to boycott the show after the Diego Rivera mural Man at the Crossroads was deliberately destroyed during the construction of Rockefeller Center. Miller asked Barr to intercede in the controversy, which he did.

Not long after that she put on her "best summer hat" and went to the Museum to ask him for a job. Barr hired her as his assistant curator in 1934 and over the years she progressed through the ranks, becoming Barr's most trusted collaborator and, by 1947, curator of the museum collections.

In 1959, Miller was appointed to the art committee for One Chase Manhattan Plaza,  serving with Gordon Bunshaft (chief designer for Skidmore, Owings and Merrill), Robert Hale (curator of American painting at the Metropolitan Museum of Art), James Johnson Sweeney (director of the Solomon R. Guggenheim Museum), Perry Rathbone (director of the Museum of Fine Arts, Boston), and Alfred H. Barr, Jr.

In 1968, she was appointed to a commission to choose modern art works for the Governor Nelson A. Rockefeller Empire State Plaza Art Collection in Albany, NY.

After her retirement from MoMA in 1969, Miller became a trustee and art advisor for Rockefeller University, the Port Authority of New York and New Jersey, and the Hirshhorn Museum and Sculpture Garden. She was an honorary trustee of MoMA from 1984 until her death in 2003 at age 99.

The Americans shows
From the early 1940s through the early 1960s, Miller organised six contemporary Americans shows  which introduced a total of ninety artists to the American museum public.  In contrast to the usual large group shows, in which hundreds of artists are represented by one work each, Miller devised a format in which larger selections of works by a smaller number of artists were represented in individual galleries. She famously said, "What you try to achieve are climaxes—introduction, surprise, going around the corner and seeing something unexpected, perhaps several climaxes with very dramatic things, then a quiet tapering off with something to let you out alive."

Americans 1942: 18 Artists From 9 States

 Darrell Austin
 Hyman Bloom
 Raymond Breinin
 Samuel Cashwan
 Francis Chapin

 Emma Lu Davis
 Morris Graves
 Joseph Hirsch
 Donal Hord
 Charles Howard

 Rico Lebrun
 Jack Levine
 Helen Lundeberg
 Fletcher Martin
 Octavio Medellin

 Knud Merrild
 Mitchell Siporin
 Everett Spruce

1946: Fourteen Americans

 David Aronson
 Ben Culwell
 Arshile Gorky
 David Hare

 Loren MacIver
 Robert Motherwell
 Isamu Noguchi
 I. Rice Pereira

 Alton Pickens
 C. S. Price
 Theodore Roszak
 Honoré Desmond Sharrer

 Saul Steinberg
 Mark Tobey

1952: Fifteen Americans

 William Baziotes
 Edward Corbett
 Edwin Dickinson
 Herbert Ferber

 Joseph Glasco
 Herbert Katzman
 Frederick Kiesler
 Irving Kriesberg

 Richard Lippold
 Jackson Pollock
 Herman Rose
 Mark Rothko

 Clyfford Still
 Bradley Tomlin
 Thomas Wilfred

1956: Twelve Americans

 Ernest Briggs
 James Brooks
 Sam Francis

 Fritz Glarner
 Philip Guston
 Raoul Hague

 Grace Hartigan
 Franz Kline
 Ibram Lassaw

 Seymour Lipton
 Jose de Rivera
 Larry Rivers

1959: Sixteen Americans

 Jay DeFeo
 Wally Hedrick
 James Jarvaise
 Jasper Johns

 Ellsworth Kelly
 Alfred Leslie
 Landes Lewitin
 Richard Lytle

 Robert Mallary
 Louise Nevelson
 Robert Rauschenberg
 Julius Schmidt

 Richard Stankiewicz
 Frank Stella
 Albert Urban
 Jack Youngerman

Americans 1963

 Richard Anuszkiewicz
 Lee Bontecou
 Chryssa
 Sally Drummond

 Edward Higgins
 Robert Indiana
 Gabriel Kohn
 Michael Lekakis

 Richard Lindner
 Marisol
 Claes Oldenburg
 Ad Reinhardt

 James Rosenquist
 Jason Seley
 David Simpson

The New American Painting
On an international scale, Miller's most influential show was The New American Painting,  which toured eight European countries in 1958 and 1959.  This exhibition significantly changed European perceptions of American art, firmly establishing the importance of contemporary American painting, particularly the American abstract expressionists, for an international audience.

The New American Painting tour showcased eighty-one paintings by seventeen artists:

 William Baziotes
 James Brooks
 Sam Francis
 Arshile Gorky
 Adolph Gottlieb

 Philip Guston
 Grace Hartigan
 Franz Kline
 Willem de Kooning
 Robert Motherwell

 Barnett Newman
 Jackson Pollock
 Mark Rothko
 Theodoros Stamos
 Clyfford Still

 Bradley Tomlin
 Jack Tworkov

Tributes
 "She was a straight shooter, very respectful of the art and the artists and the museum, something you don't get that much of anymore.  The Americans shows set the tone for my time. ... They were exhibitions of what was going on, pointing to the future" – Frank Stella
 "Her eyes were just incredible, smart and very important in the art world.  There will never be anyone quite like her again." – Ellsworth Kelly
 "She brought sparkle and prestige and credibility to American art." – James Rosenquist
 "Miller's career was marked by an uncanny ability to recognize new and innovative artists encompassing many different styles.  In a career that spanned more than 60 years, she left many more conservative curators in her wake." – Wendy Jeffers

Awards
Awards and honors in recognition of Dorothy Miller's contributions to museum connoisseurship included: 
 1959:  Smith College, honorary Doctor of Letters
 1982:  Williams College, honorary degree
 1982:  A Curator's Choice, 1942-63: A Tribute to Dorothy Miller, Rosa Esman Gallery, New York City.
 1983:  Skowhegan School of Painting and Sculpture governor's award

Books
(This is an incomplete list.) 
 1981:  The Nelson A. Rockefeller Collection. With Lee Boltin, William Slattery Lieberman, Nelson Rockefeller, and Alfred H. Barr, Jr.  Manchester, Vermont: Hudson Hills Press.   .
 1983:  Edward Hicks: His Peaceable Kingdoms and Other Paintings.  With Eleanor Price Mather.  Newark, Delaware: University of Delaware Press.  .
 1984:  Art at Work: The Chase Manhattan Collection.  With Willard C. Butcher, David Rockefeller, Robert Rosenblum, and J. Walter Severinghaus, the project manager for One Chase Manhattan Plaza.  Marshall Lee, ed.  Boston, Massachusetts: E. P. Dutton.  .
 1985:  Art for the Public: The Collection of the Port Authority of New York and New Jersey.  With Sam Hunter.  New York City: The Authority.  .

References

Further reading

External links
Dorothy C. Miller's collection at the Archives of American Art

1904 births
2003 deaths
American art curators
American women curators
People associated with the Museum of Modern Art (New York City)
Smith College alumni
People from Hopedale, Massachusetts
People from Montclair, New Jersey
People from Greenwich Village